Ethelbert is an unincorporated urban community in the Municipality of Ethelbert, Manitoba, Canada.

Originally incorporated as a village in 1950, the community was re-classified as an unincorporated urban community on 1 January 2015, following the municipal amalgamations in Manitoba.

The primary industries of Ethelbert are agriculture, logging and tourism.

Demographics 

Attractions 
The Ethelbert and District Museum is open in the summer and museum features a rich collection of many local artefacts as well as a gift shop.

Ethelbert is surrounded by 100s of lakes which provide entertainment like fishing, swimming, and water sports like boating and kayaking. Nearby lakes include:

 Jackfish Lake  
 Spray Lake  
 Lake Winnipeg

Climate 
Precipitation data from Environment Canada.
The climate in the summer is warm and humid with temperatures reaching 50 °F (10 °C) to 75 °F (24 °C) and humidity in the 90s. It usually rains for 6–8 days a month during the summer.

Climate in the winter is a whole different story with the temperature reaching 17 °F (-8 °C) to -15 °F (-26 °C). It rains about 5–6 days a month during the winter.

References 

Designated places in Manitoba
Ethelbert
Unincorporated urban communities in Manitoba
Former villages in Manitoba
Populated places disestablished in 2015
2015 disestablishments in Manitoba